Traci Renee Braxton (April 2, 1971 – March 12, 2022) was an American singer, reality television personality, and radio personality.

Early life 
Braxton was born in Severn, Maryland as the third child of her parents. Her father, Michael Conrad Braxton Sr., was a Methodist clergyman and power company worker, and her mother, Evelyn Jackson, a native of South Carolina, was a former opera singer and cosmetologist, as well as a pastor. Braxton's maternal grandfather was also a pastor.

Braxton has an older brother, Michael Jr. (born in 1968), and four sisters, Toni (born in 1967), Towanda (born in 1973), Trina (born in 1974) and Tamar (born in 1977). Braxton and her siblings were raised in a strict religious household, and Braxton's first performing experience was singing in her church choir.

Career

1989–1991: Career beginnings with The Braxtons 
Toni, Traci, Towanda, Trina, and Tamar Braxton signed their first record deal with Arista Records in 1989. In 1990, they released their first single, "Good Life". It would be their only single as a fivesome. "Good Life" peaked at No. 79 on the Billboard Hot R&B/Hip-Hop Singles chart. At the time of the single's release, the members' age differences created a problem with marketing. Subsequently, The Braxtons were dropped from Arista Records.

In 1991, during a showcase with Antonio "L.A." Reid and Kenneth "Babyface" Edmonds, who were in the process of forming LaFace Records, Toni Braxton, minus her four sisters, was chosen and signed as the label's first female solo artist. At the time, the remaining members were told that LaFace was not looking for another girl group since it had just signed TLC.

1992–1995: Career complications and pregnancy 

After Toni's departure from the group in 1991, the remaining Braxtons members became backup singers for Toni's first U.S. tour, music videos, and promotional appearances. Traci, Towanda, Trina, and Tamar were featured in the music video for Toni Braxton's third single, "Seven Whole Days", from her debut album.

In 1993, LaFace Records A&R Vice President, Bryant Reid, signed The Braxtons to LaFace. However, the group never released an album or single for the record label. When Reid moved on to work for Atlantic Records, he convinced executives at LaFace to allow him take the group to Atlantic also.

It was reported in Vibe magazine that in 1995, Traci Braxton had left the group to pursue a career as a youth counselor. However, it was not confirmed until 2004 when Towanda Braxton appeared in season 2 of the reality show Starting Over, that Traci was not allowed to sign with Atlantic because of her pregnancy at the time.

2011–2014: Reality television 
In 2011, Braxton reunited with her sisters for the WE tv reality show, Braxton Family Values. She makes appearances as backing vocal singer of her sisters in some shows over the years. In 2013, Braxton and her husband Kevin Surratt joined the third season of Marriage Boot Camp.

In 2013, Braxton began her solo career after signing with independent media conglomerate Entertainment One under eOne Music and Soul World Entertainment to release an album. The same year, she got her own radio show called The Traci Braxton show on the BLIS.F.M. radio.

Her solo debut album, Crash & Burn, was released on October 7, 2014. The album's lead single "Last Call" peaked at number 16 on the US R&B Adult. "Crash & Burn" debuted at No. 108 on the Billboard Hot 200 with sales of 4,000 in its first week. The album also reached No. 11 on the relaunched Billboard R&B Albums chart and at No. 1 on the Heatseekers Albums chart. A follow-up single "Perfect Time" was released in 2015.

2015–2022: The Braxtons reunion, films and On Earth 
On January 14, 2015, she joined the judging panel of Mrs. DC America 2015. In October 2015, The Braxtons released their second album Braxton Family Christmas. The album was released on October 30 and pre-ordered on October 16. Braxton Family Christmas debuted at number 27 on the US Billboard R&B/Hip-Hop Albums, number 10 on the US R&B chart and number 12 on US Top Holiday Albums on November 21, 2015. The album charted at number 1 on the US Heatseekers Albums on December 12, 2015.

On May 17, 2016, during a Facebook live video on the Braxton Family Values page it was announced that Braxton was releasing a new single in 2016 titled "Body Shots" from her upcoming second studio album.

On May 21, 2017, she starred on the stageplay There's a Stranger in My House. On September 26, 2017, Braxton was featured on the Kokayi rapper title "Moonlight".

On April 20, 2018, she released the single "Broken Things" featuring her sisters Toni, Towanda and Trina. On August 3, 2018, Traci Braxton released "Lifeline" as the official lead single from her second album, On Earth, which was released on August 24, 2018.

In the same time, she made her movie acting debut in the feature film Sinners Wanted. On June 13, 2019, she acted in the film, All In, starring Lil Mama.

On December 12, 2020, she starred in the film The Christmas Lottery.

On September 24, 2021, she was featured on the song "Stay with Me", performed by Candiace, taken from her album Deep Space.

Death 
Braxton died on March 12, 2022, at the age of 50. She had been suffering from esophageal cancer for at least one year before her death.

In addition to her parents, sisters, and brother, she is survived by her husband, Kevin Surrat, their son, Kevin Surrat Jr. and his wife Olivia (née Barron), and her grandson, Kevin Surrat, III.

Discography

Albums

Singles

Appearances 

Film
2018: Sinners Wanted: Nana
2019: All In: Foster Mom
2020: The Christmas Lottery: Announcer

Television
 Braxton Family Values (as herself, 2011–2020)
 Marriage Boot Camp (as herself, 2014)

Radio
 The Traci Braxton Show

Theater
 There's a Stranger in My House (2017)

References

External links 

1971 births
2022 deaths
20th-century African-American women singers
21st-century African-American women singers
Methodists from Maryland
American contemporary R&B singers
Deaths from esophageal cancer
Place of death missing
Musicians from Maryland
People from Severn, Maryland
The Braxtons members